Michael or Mike Small may refer to:

Mike Small (footballer) (born 1962), English former footballer
Mike Small (golfer) (born 1966), American golfer and college golf coach
Mike Small (author), activist, writer and publisher
Michael Small (1939–2003), American film score composer
Michael Small (diplomat), Canadian ambassador to Cuba preceding Alexandra Bugailiskis